Karen Dunbar (born 1 April 1971) is a Scottish comedian, actress and writer. She first appeared on television on the BBC Scotland sketch comedy series Chewin' the Fat (1999–2002), and was subsequently given her own show by the channel titled The Karen Dunbar Show (2003–2006).

Early life
Dunbar was born in Glasgow and moved to Ayr at an early age. She attended Ayr Academy.

Career

Chewin' the Fat
Dunbar began her career as a DJ and karaoke host before she attended The Comedy Unit's open auditions in 1997 where she was cast in the BBC Scotland comedy sketch show Chewin' the Fat. It has been rumoured that Dunbar was offered the role of Isa for the spin-off Still Game focusing on the characters Jack Jarvis and Victor McDade, but she declined in order to star in her own show. No such rumour has ever been confirmed nor denied by Dunbar or any of her former co-stars.

The Karen Dunbar Show
She was subsequently given her own show by the channel, The Karen Dunbar Show, which received two coveted Golden Rose nominations for Best Comedy Show and Karen herself two personal nominations for Best Comedy Performance.

Karen has presented BBC Radio Scotland series such as Karen Dunbar’s Beautiful Sunday and Karen’s Summer Supplement, as well as being Team Captain on the quiz show Step Back in Time.

Theatre
In Christmas 2007, Dunbar made her first appearance in pantomime, at the King's Theatre in Glasgow, playing Nanny Begood in Sleeping Beauty. Further pantomime roles include the dual role of the Good Fairy and the Wicked Stepmother in Cinderella (2008–09) and Widow Twankey in Aladdin (2009–10). She appeared as a critic on Britain's Got More Talent on 27 May 2008. She played the fairy godmother in Cinderella (2012–13) and appeared in the 2013–14 season as a new character, the Slave of the Ring, in Aladdin.

As a comedy actress, she has also tackled serious roles, most notably to date her performance in the poetic monologue A Drunk Woman Looks at the Thistle adapted by Denise Mina from Hugh MacDiarmid's poem of the same name. In between 2012 and 2016, she was featured in Phyllida Lloyd's acclaimed trilogy of all-female Shakespeare plays at the Donmar Warehouse,  playing Casca in Julius Caesar, Bardolph/Vernon in Henry IV and Trinculo in The Tempest.

Happy Hollidays
In 2009, Dunbar starred in a six-part series of the Scottish comedy Happy Hollidays. She  played the role of Arme Gonnerssen in M.I. High in 2009.

Recent work
In 2014, she was lead compère at the XX Commonwealth Games opening ceremony held in Glasgow alongside John Barrowman. Barrowman and Dunbar sang and performed a showcase of Scottish culture, inventions and places during the broadcast, which reached a global audience of 1.5 billion people. In October 2017 Dunbar appeared in BBC Scotland's River City for a special one-off appearance. She played the part of Francesca Simpson, estranged wife of Pete Galloway (played by Andy Gray).

In 2019, Dunbar appeared in the tours Calendar Girls and Still Game Live: The Final Farewell.

Personal life
Dunbar is a lesbian. She featured on The Scotsman'''s "Pink List" of LGBT people contributing to Scotland's cultural life in 2014 and was awarded the Role Model of the Year award at the Icon Awards which celebrate Scotland's LGBTI community in 2015. She spoke about her experiences of homophobia and the acceptance she found in Glasgow's LGBT community in a BBC documentary, I Belong to Glasgow'', screened in 2014. She spoke in 2016 about her plans to marry her female partner.
In 2018, Dunbar gave a TED talk in Glasgow in which she spoke briefly about her recovery from a challenging upbringing, prior alcoholism and a distasteful change in her comedic style, which she later remedied.

Filmography

Television

Film

Theatre credits

References

External links

1971 births
Living people
People educated at Ayr Academy
People from Ayr
Scottish film actresses
Scottish television actresses
Scottish lesbian actresses
Scottish lesbian writers
Scottish women comedians
Lesbian comedians
Scottish LGBT entertainers
Comedians from Glasgow
20th-century Scottish comedians
21st-century Scottish comedians
20th-century Scottish women
British LGBT comedians